According to a report by the Food and Agriculture Organization of the United Nations, Myanmar (also known as Burma) lost 19%, or 7,445,000 hectares (28,750 sq mi), of forest between 1990 and 2010. With forest covering as much as 70% of Burma at the time of independence, there were only slightly more than 48% forest cover left as of 2014. The deforestation rate of Myanmar has declined from 0.95% per year in the years 1990–2010 to about 0.3% per year and deforestation in Myanmar is now less than other countries of the region such as Indonesia or Vietnam, but still remains an important environmental issue. Three main factors contribute to continued deforestation: unsustainable and illegal logging, unresolved land rights and land disputes and extensive agricultural development.

Myanmar possesses the largest expanse of tropical forest in mainland Southeast Asia with a biodiversity much greater than temperate forests. As of 2010, Burma's living forest biomass holds 1,654 million metric tons of carbon and is home to over 80 endemic species. Despite the diversity and size of Burma's forests, only 6.3% of the land is protected and much of it is under the threat of deforestation.

History

Colonial era

Although the traditional agricultural practice of swiddening has been practised in Burma for thousands of years, there are no signs that it led to significant deforestation and may in fact have helped maintain the forests. Significant deforestation in Burma began in the 1800s as the British cut down large expanses of forest for timber, a resource in high demand for the empire. Hardwoods were very important to the British for shipbuilding, especially teak which was valued for its durability and water resistant properties.

Following the annexation of Lower Burma in 1856, the British colonial government established the Forest Department in an effort to establish a sustainable system for logging. Coming mainly from Pegu Range of central Burma, logs would be pulled by elephants to rivers and then floated downstream to sawmills. The imperial demand for timber established logging as the main source of revenue for British Burma. Right before World War II, British Burma peaked logging operations, producing 447,000 tons of timber.

Post-independence 
After independence in 1948, ethnic uprisings and civil unrest pushed aside both conservation and logging efforts. Insurgent groups holding control of the majority of Burma's forested regions made it increasingly dangerous for the Forest Department and the State Timber Board (the government's organisation in charge of teak extraction) to carry out operations.

State logging activities recommenced with vigor, however, after the establishment of General Ne Win's military regime in 1962. The government, under military rule and the Burma Socialist Programme Party, claimed control of the forests and supported a State Timber Board nearly seven times larger than the 1952 establishment. The growth of the State Timber Board represents a growing importance of timber exports. While teak exports represented only 4% of total exports in 1952, by the late 1980s they accounted for up to 42%.

As a result, over 120,000 square kilometres (46,000 sq mi) of forest cover were lost between the late 1960s and the late 1980s. Forest cover decreased from about 70% at the time of independence to 46% in the late 1980s.

The 1988 uprising and formation of the State Law and Order Restoration Council (SLORC) changed little in terms of the state's policy on deforestation. In 1989 the Burmese state made deals with 42 Thai logging companies to log within the Thai-Burmese border resulting in the destructive deforestation of up to 18,000 square kilometres (7,000 sq mi). In 1992 the SLORC passed a new Forest Law that, for the first time, put emphasis on environmental conservation and in 1993 shut down the Thai logging deals (Bryant). Despite the new law, unregulated logging operations and exports continue to threaten the hardwood forests and continue the pace of deforestation.

Causes

Economic development 
Burma's regime of totalitarian socialism, lasting until 1988, left the country economically stunted and one of the world's most impoverished countries. Recent efforts to integrate back into the international economy have led to an influx of state development projects, many of which exploit Burma's natural resources and forests. International development groups such as the World Bank have emphasised across Southeast Asia the role of forests as fuel for economic growth.

While international pressure and support for economic development has increased, the technique of forest conversion has been employed in Burma since the colonial era. Burma and many other Southeast Asian states have encouraged the conversion of forested land into rice paddies, rubber plantations, teak plantations, or other exportable crops. State control over forests has contributed significantly to deforestation as the government uses Burma's abundance of natural resources to develop economically.

Population growth 

The population of Burma has been growing at an increasing rate since 2005, creating a need for expansion and development. Burma's growing population requires more resources to sustain it, often at the expense of forests and other natural resources. With much of the population growth happening in rural areas, food demands lead to more intense agriculture and expansion into forested land.

Additionally, many rural Burmese depend on the forest for resources such as firewood, charcoal, and farm materials. As population increases these demands will become unsustainable and lead to a serious loss of forest cover, especially around population centres.

Illegal logging 
Due to the size and scope of Burma's forests, it is difficult for government organisations like Forest Department to regulate logging. There is a high demand for timber from Burma's neighbours–notably Thailand and China–who have depleted their forests much more than Burma (plunder). As a result, numerous illegal logging operations have sprung up near the Thai-Burmese border and in the province of Kachin along the Chinese border.  Logs are commonly cut on the Burmese side and then smuggled to processing facilities in China or Thailand.

Lack of regulations has led to unbridled and destructive logging that has caused environmental damage such as soil erosion, river contamination, and increased flooding. In Kachin State, which has some of the largest expanses of relatively untouched forest, illegal logging accounts for up to half of the deforestation. Due to the remoteness of these regions and the international demand for hardwoods, illegal logging is a threat that is hard to address and will probably continue contributing to deforestation. A major problem is that illegal logging is still classified in Myanmar as an environmental matter, and not as a criminal act, making it difficult for the Forest Department to bring a lawsuit against the offenders.

Agricultural expansion 
As a result of continuing rural population growth, new agricultural areas have developed across Burma. While it is hard to get precise data on how much deforestation is done to make room for cultivation, it is clear that agricultural expansion is a factor. Even though large areas of forest are not commonly cleared for agriculture, logged areas can quickly become agricultural as people take advantage of the space to plant crops. Agricultural expansion will continue as the population increases and Burma produces more crops for export.

Corruption
Burma is one of the world's most corrupt nations, negatively impacting the straightforward implementation of law and government policy. The 2012 Transparency International Corruption Perceptions Index ranked the country at number 171, out of 176 countries in total.

Affected regions

In the years from 1990 to 2000, the greatest amount of deforestation in Burma occurred mainly in the more densely populated central regions of the country. More remote areas such as Kachin State, Chin State, and Tanintharyi Division had a lower rate of deforestation probably due to a smaller population demand and less state control. 
In recent years the pattern has changed so that recent deforestation hot spots are located in those areas that have previously been spared, namely in Kachin State, Tanintharyi Division and Sagaing Region.

The northern edge of the central dry zone and Ayeyarwady valley is significantly affected by deforestation. Mainly a result of agricultural expansion, over 7% of the land has been deforested. This leads to many environmental concerns as the dry forests of this region support many diverse and vulnerable flora and fauna that rely on this habitat.

Ayeyarwady Delta 
The Ayeyarwady Delta Region was the most threatened region, experiencing an average annual deforestation rate of 1.2% from 1990 to 2000, a rate four times the national average. The Ayeyarwady Region has a population of over 8 million people and is a large agricultural centre, accounting for about 35% of the country's rice production. As a result of agricultural expansion and the use of wood for fuel, mangrove cover declined 64.2% from 1978 to 2011 and continues to disappear. Home to some of the most diverse mangrove forests, this deforestation has significant repercussions both economically and environmentally. Mangroves provide protection from tropical cyclones, seasonal flooding, and are crucial for the fishing industry that is an important livelihood for much of the coast.

Tanintharyi Region 
In 1999, the ruling military junta, the State Peace and Development Council, initiated the large-scale development of such plantations, especially in Tanintharyi Region, the southernmost region of Myanmar. As of 2019, over 401,814 ha of palm oil concessions have been awarded to 44 companies. 60% of the awarded concessions consist of forests and native vegetation, and some concessions overlap with national parks, including Tanintharyi and Lenya National Parks, which have seen significant deforestation and threaten conservation efforts for endemic species like the Indochinese tiger.

Conservation
The longest standing forestry conservation practice in Burma is the traditional practice of swidden agriculture. The slash and burn techniques of forest inhabitants, the majority of whom are tribal minorities, are often blamed for causing deforestation. This practice, rather than being destructive, can be shown to cause regeneration of the forest if they are given enough space.  
One of the first systems of forestry management imposed by the Burmese government was the Burma Selection System (BSS), started during British colonial rule in the late 1800s. The BSS became a world-renowned system and was the basis for a sustainable forestry in Southeast Asia.

Now called the Myanmar Selection System (MSS), this technique is still used today, primarily for the management of natural teak forests. The MSS divides a forest into 30 equal plots, which are each put on a 30-year felling cycle. When a block is due for harvest, trees larger than a certain diameter are cut until allowable volume is removed. When a tree is cut, they are pulled out through the traditional use of elephants rather than large machines, which are harmful to the soil. The MSS is a sustainable approach to logging that allows forests to restore themselves and does not deplete large swaths of land.

See also

 Wildlife of Burma
 Agriculture in Burma
 Ministry of Environmental Conservation and Forestry (Burma)

Regional:
 Deforestation in Thailand
 Deforestation in Laos
 Deforestation in Indonesia

References 

Burma
Environment of Myanmar